Raymon is a given name. Notable people with the name include:

Raymon Anning, former Commissioner of Police of Hong Kong
Raymon Ayala (born 1977), known as Daddy Yankee, Latin Grammy Award-winning Puerto Rican Reggaeton recording artist
Raymon van der Biezen (born 1987), Dutch BMX racer
Raymon van Emmerik (born 1980), Dutch footballer
Raymon Gaddis or Ray Gaddis (born 1990), American soccer player
Raymon W. Herndon (1918–1942), United States Marine in World War II
Raymon de Penaforte (1175–1275), Catalan Dominican friar in the 13th-century, who compiled the Decretals of Gregory IX
Raymon Reifer (born 1991), Barbadian cricketer
Raymon Youmaran, member of Dlasthr (The Last Hour), an Assyrian criminal gang active in Sydney, Australia

See also
USS Raymon W. Herndon (APD-121), United States Navy high-speed transport in commission from 1944 to 1946
Ramona
Ramone (disambiguation)
Ramón (disambiguation)
Raemon Sluiter (born 1978), Dutch former tennis player
Raemon, North Carolina, United States, a census-designated place
Rayman
Raymond
Reamonn
Ryman